A Legacy of Spies is a 2017 spy novel by British writer John le Carré.

Background

A Legacy of Spies is both a prequel and sequel to John le Carré's The Spy Who Came In from the Cold. In that book, MI6 agent Alec Leamas, motivated by the death of his operative Karl Riemeck in East Berlin, agrees to undertake one final mission to get revenge on the man he believes to be Riemeck's murderer, a high-ranking member of the Stasi named Hans-Dieter Mundt.

In the course of Leamas's mission, which finds him unexpectedly extracted to East Berlin, he – along with his lover, a young Communist sympathiser named Liz Gold – is shot to death at the Berlin Wall, on orders of Mundt. The men responsible for dispatching Leamas – intelligence chief Control, Control's right-hand-man George Smiley, and Smiley's protégé Peter Guillam – escape unscathed, and it is revealed that Mundt was a double agent they were trying to protect all along, without telling Leamas.

Plot overview
Now older and living in retirement on a farm in his native Brittany, Peter Guillam – who narrates the story in the first person – is summoned to MI6 headquarters to account for his actions during Operation Windfall, the espionage mission depicted in The Spy Who Came in from the Cold. Learning that Alec Leamas's now adult son, Christoph, is suing the British government for the wrongful death of his father and Elizabeth Gold, Guillam ruminates on the course of events that led to the death of agent Karl Riemeck, and how Guillam and Leamas worked together to try and save not only Riemeck's life but the lives of several other East Germans working with him to provide intelligence information to Britain. The narrative also ties events from other novels featuring George Smiley and Guillam, such as Call for the Dead and Tinker, Tailor, Soldier, Spy, into the backstory of The Spy Who Came In from the Cold, and characters from those novels including Hans-Dieter Mundt, Bill Haydon, and Jim Prideaux make appearances.

The book alternates between Guillam's recollections of the events leading up to Leamas's demise and his attempts in the present day to stop feeling guilty for his role; his avoidance of Christoph, who wants to blackmail him; and his efforts to learn the whereabouts of Smiley, who has gone off the grid following his own retirement.

Themes
In an interview with the NPR series Fresh Air broadcast in the United States on 5 September 2017, le Carré told host Terry Gross that one of the reasons for writing the novel was "to make a case for Europe" in the wake of the 2016 British referendum, which resulted in a slim majority voting in favour of leaving the European Union. One conversation in the novel sounds like an emotional case for Remain and against Brexit: "'So was it all for England, then?' [Smiley] resumed. 'There was a time, of course there was. But whose England? Which England? England all alone, a citizen of nowhere? I'm a European, Peter."

Critical reception
Writing in The Guardian, reviewer Robert McCrum called the novel "poignant and brilliant".  Despite some misgivings, The New York Times reviewer Dwight Garner described it as "simmering".

Notes

References

Novels by John le Carré
British spy novels
2017 British novels
Viking Press books